A by-election was held for the New South Wales Legislative Assembly electorate of Redfern on 8 September 1888 because of the death of James Farnell.

Dates

Candidates

 Peter Howe (Protectionist) was a leather dresser and Mayor of Waterloo.

 John Martin (Free Trade) was a house and land agent and the son-in-law of the former member James Farnell. This was his second and final time as a candidate, having previously been unsuccessful in 1885 (Redfern).

Result

James Farnell died.

See also
Electoral results for the district of Redfern
List of New South Wales state by-elections

References

1888 elections in Australia
New South Wales state by-elections
1880s in New South Wales